is a Japanese footballer who plays for Cerezo Osaka.

Club statistics
Updated to 18 February 2019.

References

External links

Profile at Consadole Sapporo

1996 births
Living people
Association football people from Hokkaido
Japanese footballers
J1 League players
J2 League players
J3 League players
Hokkaido Consadole Sapporo players
J.League U-22 Selection players
Association football defenders
Sportspeople from Sapporo